Peristernia rollandi is a species of sea snail, a marine gastropod mollusk in the family Fasciolariidae, the spindle snails, the tulip snails and their allies.

Description
The length of the shell attains 42.3 mm.

Distribution
This marine species occurs off New Caledonia.

References

 Bernardi, A. B., & Crosse, 1861 Journal de Conchyliologie, 9
 Fischer-Piette, E., 1950. Listes des types décrits dans le Journal de Conchyliologie et conservés dans la collection de ce journal. Journal de Conchyliologie 90: 8-23

Fasciolariidae
Gastropods described in 1861